Danjia may refer to:

Danjia Township, a township in Cangyuan Va Autonomous County, Yunan, China
Tanka people, an ethnic subgroup in Southern coastal China who lived on junks

See also
Danja (disambiguation)